Aitch may refer to:

Aitch, a phonetic representation of the letter H
Aitch (artist), a Romanian comics creator
Aitch (rapper) (born 1999), British rapper
Aitch (surname)
Aitch, Pennsylvania, an extinct town in Huntingdon County
Aitch bone, the rump bone in cattle; see Rump steak

See also
Aich (surname)
Aitch-dropping, in phonetics
H (disambiguation)